Ballyduff G.A.A. is a Gaelic Athletic Association club in Ballyduff, Co Kerry, Ireland. The club fields both Hurling and Gaelic football teams. The club won the All-Ireland Senior Hurling Championship Final in 1891.

History

All Ireland Champions

Ballyduff won the All-Ireland Senior Hurling Championship in 1891. They beat Wexford side Crossabeg 2-04 to 1-05 in the final. They beat Limerick's Treaty Stone in the Munster Final by 1-02 to 1-01. The team was trained by James McDonnell. This is the only time that the title was won by a Kerry team.

All-Ireland Winning Team
John Mahony, (Ballyduff) (Capt.); Maurice Fitzmaurice; (Ahabeg) Maurice Kelly, (Ahabeg) John Murphy, (Ahabeg) Jack O'Sullivan, (Ballyduff) Paddy Carr O'Carroll, (Ballyduff) Pat Wynne, (Ballyduff) Jim McDonnell, (Ballyduff) Michael O'Sullivan, (Ballyduff) James Crowley, (Ballyduff) Frank Crowley, (Ballyduff) Pat O'Rourke, (Kilmoyley) Thade Eugene McCarthy, (Kilmoyley) Thade Donal McCarthy, (Ardfert) Michael McCarthy, (Ardfert) Michael Riordan, (Ardfert) Richard Kissane, (Ballyduff) Pat Quane, (Kilmoyley) Jackeen Quane, (Kilmoyley) Michael Kirby, (Kilmoyley) Tom Dunne, (Ballyduff).

Subs: J Murphy, (Dromartin) Pat Flanagan, (Ballyduff) Willie O'Connell, (Ballinorig) James Pierce, (Rahela) was unable to travel.

Ballyduff have won the County Senior Championship more times than any other team winning 25 times the last in 2017 when they beat Lixnaw in a reply on a scoreline of 4:13-1:19 in the final.

The Boys From Ballyduff
This song was written by P.J. Sheehy on the occasion of the Ballyduff/Crossabeg All-Ireland Hurling final in 1891. Patrick Sheehy was grandfather of Sean Sheehy who won championship medals with Ballyduff in 1972 and 1973, and great-grandfather of Tomas O'Sullivan who won championship medals with Ballyduff in 1988 and 1989.

Just a mile or thereabouts,

From the lordly Shannon mouth,

There's a spot to which none other I'd compare;

It's a village, not a town,

Though her sons have gained renown,

For the Boys from Ballyduff are always there.

Roll of honour

Hurling
 All-Ireland Senior Hurling Championship 1:
 1891
 Munster Senior Hurling Championship 1:
 1891
 Kerry Senior Hurling Championship 25:
 1891, 1955, 1957, 1959, 1960, 1961, 1965, 1966, 1972, 1973, 1976, 1977, 1978, 1984, 1988, 1989, 1991, 1993, 1994, 1995, 2006, 2010, 2011, 2012, 2017
 Munster Intermediate Club Hurling Championship Runners-up 
 2011, 2012
 Kerry Minor Hurling Championship  10:
 1972, 1973, 1975, 1994, 1996, 1998, 2001, 2003, 2020, 2021
 Kerry Under-21 hurling championship 4:
 2000, 2001, 2010, 2013	
 North Kerry Senior Hurling Championships 14:
 1966, 1970, 1972, 1974, 1975, 1980, 1989, 1991, 1993, 1994, 1997, 2000, 2004, 2006, 2017

Football
 North Kerry Senior Football Championship 3:
 1994, 2005, 2006

 Kerry Junior Football Championship''' 1:
 2019

Notable players
 Mikey Boyle
 Pádraig Boyle
 Paud Costelloe
 Jack Goulding
 John Mahony

References

External links
 Official Ballyduff Gaa Club website

Gaelic games clubs in County Kerry
Gaelic football clubs in County Kerry
Hurling clubs in County Kerry